Trubetsky is a Ruthenian-Polish-Russian coat of arms. It has been used by the Trubetsky family.

History

The Trubetsky coat of arms consist of four parts:

Blazon

Notable bearers
Notable bearers of this coat of arms include:
Demetriusz I Starszy
Wigund-Jeronym Trubecki
Piotr Trubecki
Ivan Bolshoy Troubetzkoy
Nikita Trubetskoy
Sergei Petrovich Troubetzkoy
Nester Trubecki
Pierre Troubetzkoy
Paolo Troubetzkoy
Yury Nolden
Tõnu Trubetsky
Wladimir Troubetzkoy

See also
 Pogoń Litewska
 Belarusian heraldry
 Polish heraldry
 Coat of arms

Belarusian coats of arms
Polish coats of arms
Russian coats of arms
Trubetskoy family
Coats of arms with crowns